Underground Kings may refer to:

UGK, or Underground Kingz, an American hip hop duo
Underground Kingz, their self-titled album
"Under Ground Kings", a song by Drake from his 2011 album Take Care